List of K-pop songs on the Billboard Japan Hot 100 is a compilation of weekly chart information for K-pop music published on the Billboard Japan Hot 100 chart by the Billboard charts, and reported on by Billboard K-Town, an online Billboard column. This is a list of K-pop songs and singles, and songs performed by K-pop artists, on the Billboard chart. More song chart information can be found at the List of K-pop songs on the Billboard charts.

2008–present

 This list depends on continual updates taken from * and *.
 Years 2008–11 on the chart are not fully updated and are marked (Incomplete)
 Years 2012–present are fully updated (Complete) with no marking
 Billboard artists comprehensive update incomplete.
 Billboard charts comprehensive update incomplete.
 Figures in red highlight indicate the highest ranking achieved by K-pop artists on the chart.
  – Current week's charting
 The chart was launched in January 2008.

See also
 List of K-pop on the Billboard charts
 List of K-pop albums on the Billboard charts
 List of K-pop songs on the Billboard charts
 List of K-pop on the Billboard year-end charts
 Timeline of K-pop at Billboard
 Timeline of K-pop at Billboard in the 2020s
 K-pop Hot 100
 List of K-pop artists
 List of South Korean idol groups

Notes

References

External links
Billboard popular charts
Billboard complete artist/chart search

Billboard charts
K-pop songs
K-pop songs
South Korean music-related lists
2009 in South Korean music
2010 in South Korean music
2011 in South Korean music
2012 in South Korean music
2013 in South Korean music
2014 in South Korean music
2015 in South Korean music
2016 in South Korean music
2017 in South Korean music
2018 in South Korean music
2019 in South Korean music
2020 in South Korean music
2021 in South Korean music
2022 in South Korean music
2023 in South Korean music
2000s in South Korean music
2010s in South Korean music
2020s in South Korean music